Moon Ska Records was one of the most influential ska record labels of the 1980s and 1990s.

The label operated from 1983 until 2000, and during those seventeen years, only released ska and ska-influenced music. Originally named Moon Records, as a tribute to Sun Records, the label changed its name to Moon Ska Records because another label owned the copyright to the Moon Records name. The label was started by Robert "Bucket" Hingley, founding member of The Toasters as a means to distribute albums by The Toasters. The label became an American source for many British ska import albums.

History
The label rose to prominence in the early 1990s by releasing albums by many of the ska genre's biggest acts, such as The Toasters, The Slackers, Hepcat, The Scofflaws, Mephiskapheles, The Pietasters and the debut album of Dance Hall Crashers — as well as many up and coming bands such as Spring Heeled Jack and Mustard Plug. The label also promoted non-Moon Ska bands, such as The Allstonians, Gals Panic, Less Than Jake, through various compilation albums. Some of these compilations featured the earliest recordings by No Doubt. In 1997, the label branched out to form Ska Satellite Records, in order to produce albums from smaller acts at a lower budget. Moon Ska also produced patches and T-shirts that were sold at ska concerts around the world.

In the mid-1990s, the label operated its own store in East Village, Manhattan. The original storefront was located at 150 East 2nd Street in the Alphabet City section of the East Village. When space became an issue, the business moved to a larger location at 84 East 10th Street. The storefront was a way for fans to purchase albums directly from the source and at cheaper prices than those of chain stores. It also became a place of social interaction for both ska band members and fans from around the world.

Amidst the end of the ska boom of the mid-1990s, sales began to drop and many records were returned to the small label. Several distribution companies were filing bankruptcy while owing Moon Ska thousands of dollars in unpaid invoices, for albums that were already sent to stores. Those same record stores refused to keep the album prices in the suggested $10 range, and instead marked them up to between $17 and $19. All of these factors led to the end of the Moon Ska store, and eventually, the label itself.

The label is survived by Moon Ska World (formerly Moon Ska Europe), which is a licensed affiliate and is not owned by Hingley. The label, based in the United Kingdom, has released albums from acts such as Rhoda Dakar, Symarip, The Big, The Upsessions, Skaville UK and Go Jimmy Go. Unlike its American sister label, Moon Ska World has released albums from outside of the ska genre. With the name change, the label shifted its focus to ska and old reggae. Moon Ska World has remained dormant since album and single releases by the Dub City Rockers in 2011.

In 2003, three years after the demise of Moon Ska Records, Hingley started his second ska label, named Megalith Records. The label has released material by The Toasters, New York Ska Jazz Ensemble, Victor Rice, Eastern Standard Time, Mr. T Bone, Bomb Town, Bigger Thomas & The Hub City Stompers.

Label roster

 The Adjusters
 Laurel Aitken
 The Allstonians
 The Articles
 The Bluebeats
 Lloyd Brevett
 The Busters
 Bad Manners
 The Boilers
 Critical Mass
 Dr. Ring-Ding & the Senior Allstars
 Dance Hall Crashers
 Easy Big Fella
 Edna's Goldfish
 Hepcat
 Inspecter 7
 Let's Go Bowling
 Los Hooligans
 Magadog
 Tommy McCook and Friends
 Mento Buru
 Mephiskapheles
 Mobtown
 Mr. Review
 Mustard Plug
Chris Murray
 New York Ska-Jazz Ensemble
 The N.Y. Citizens 
 One Groovy Coconut
 The Pietasters
 The Porkers
 The Press
 Regatta 69
 Rude Bones
 Ruder Than You
 The Scofflaws
 The Skalars
 Skanic
 Skavoovie And the Epitones
 Skinnerbox
 The Skoidats
 Skunks
 The Slackers
 The Strangeways
 Spring Heeled Jack U.S.A.
 Solabeat Alliance
 The Toasters
 The Trojans

References

See also
 List of record labels

Record labels established in 1983
Record labels disestablished in 2000
Ska record labels
Defunct record labels of the United States

ru:Moon Ska Records